The Church of Jesus Christ of Latter-day Saints (LDS Church) (Portuguese: A Igreja de Jesus Cristo dos Santos dos Últimos Dias) was established in Brazil in 1926 with the opening of the South American Mission. Missionary work was focused on small German immigrant colonies in South Brazil. The LDS Church was forced to expand missionary work to Brazilians and Portuguese speakers when non-Portuguese languages were banned in public meetings in 1938. The Brazil Mission was opened on February 9, 1935, with Rulon S. Howells as mission president. The first Portuguese translation of the Book of Mormon was published in 1939.

During Howells's second presidency in the early 1950s, he instituted programs to genealogically screen Brazilians interested in the LDS Church or its members in Brazil to prevent people with African ancestry from joining the church. Church policy at that time prevented males with African ancestry from being ordained to the a priesthood office. In 1965, church president David O. McKay changed the policy in Brazil, requiring that all men be assumed qualified to receive the priesthood unless there was obvious evidence showing otherwise. The first stake in Brazil was established in São Paulo on May 1, 1966. In 1978, the São Paulo Brazil Temple was completed, becoming the church's first temple in Brazil and South America. The temple was thought to be one factor that influenced the 1978 Revelation on Priesthood that allowed male church members of any race to receive the priesthood.

As of October 2018, the LDS Church membership records reported 1,383,799 members in Brazil. The 2010 Brazilian census reported 226,509 self-identifying specifically as LDS Church. Brazil has the most members of the LDS Church in South America and the 3rd most members of any country worldwide, behind the United States and Mexico.

History

Beginnings

Andrew Jenson traveled to South America in 1923 to determine whether the conditions were right for missionary work. However, he was not impressed with Brazil's prospects and missionaries were, instead, sent to Argentina. Max and Amalie Zapf were the first known members of the LDS Church in Brazil. They were immigrants who had joined the church in their native Germany before moving to Brazil in 1913. The Zapfs did not find other members of the LDS Church in Brazil until ten years later. The Zapfs met Augusta Kuhlmann Lippelt and her family, other LDS Church members who emigrated from Germany. The Zapfs would eventually relocate to be closer to the Lippelts. This represented the first permanent LDS Church presence in Brazil. An immigrant from Germany, Reinhold Stoof was made president of the South American Mission in May 1926. Stoof was headquartered in Buenos Aires, but realized that congregations of German immigrants were too sparse in Argentina, so he sent missionaries to the larger German colonies in Southern Brazil. The first two missionaries in Brazil were William Fred Heinz and Emil A. J. Schindler. Missionaries arrived in 1928, but due to the priesthood restriction, they were instructed to only work with German people living in the southern part of the country. Missionaries found a group of 16,000 Germans in Joinville and began baptizing them. The first people baptized in Brazil were Berta Sell and her four children on April 14, 1929. In 1929, the LDS Church acquired the first property in Brazil to serve as a meeting place for its members. On July 6, 1930, the first branch in Joinville was created. The first LDS-owned meetinghouse was dedicated on October 25, 1931, in Joinville.

The Brazil Mission was established on February 9, 1935, with Rulon S. Howells as mission president. Howells headquartered the mission in São Paulo, which officially opened on May 25, 1935. At the time, the Brazilian Mission covered what is now modern Brazil, Bolivia, Ecuador, Colombia, Venezuela, Guyana, Suriname, and French Guiana. During this time, the mission targeted the German speaking people in Brazil. Church literature in German was ordered, and missionaries were taught German for the first three years of missionary work there. After more Portuguese-speaking Brazilians became interested, which had a high proportion of people with mixed ancestry, LDS officials advised missionaries to avoid teaching people who appeared to have black ancestry. When the Brazilian government outlawed the use of non-Portuguese languages in public meetings in 1938, the mission switched from a German language mission to a Portuguese-speaking one. Consequently, missionaries in Brazil began learning Portuguese. However, missionaries still remained in Southern Brazil, where there would be more European immigrants and less interracial Brazilians. The missionaries later realized that they would not be able to avoid teaching and interacting with people of African descent, because housing was not segregated in Brazil.

John Alden Bowers became mission president in 1938, and he oversaw the translation of missionary pamphlets and the Book of Mormon into Portuguese. Howells asked Mário Pedroso, a Brazilian native, to work on a translation of the Book of Mormon into Portuguese. Daniel G. Shupe worked on his own Portuguese translation of the Book of Mormon. A retired Brazilian newspaper editor compared the two translations to determine which was the best translation of the English words. The first Portuguese translation of the Book of Mormon was published in Brazil in 1939. One of the early missionaries in Brazil, serving in 1939, was James E. Faust. During World War II, many missionaries were sent home. William West Seegmiller became mission president in 1942, serving for three years, but no missionaries were sent to Brazil during his presidency. Harold Morgan Rex became mission president in 1945 with only two missionaries sent to Brazil before 1946 when normal missionary work resumed. In 1949, Rulon S. Howells became mission president again. On his way to Brazil, Howells stopped in Washington D.C. and met the Brazilian Ambassador to the United States, Maurício Nabuco. Two of the governors of Brazil helped him register the LDS Church with the Brazilian government, as well as achieving tax exemption status. The Doctrine and Covenants and the Pearl of Great Price were translated into Portuguese in 1950 and 1952, respectively. In 1954, LDS Church president David O. McKay visited Brazil during a world tour.

Mission development and racial implications
During the 1950s, in some areas in Brazil, up to 80% of the population was thought to have African ancestry, however this was difficult to prove due to inadequate recorded evidence. During the time Howells served for the second time as mission president, the primary goal for the Brazil Mission was racial purity for all new converts. He told the missionaries to scrutinize people's appearances for hints of black ancestry and avoid teaching those who had any black ancestry. Missionaries were instructed to look for relatives of the investigators if they were not sure about their racial heritage. If during the course of the lessons, it was discovered they had black ancestry, they were discouraged from investigating the church.  In Piracicaba, where several black people had joined, Howells segregated the branch so that black people would stop coming. He instituted a genealogy program to determine race and screened all baptisms. If it was discovered a member had black ancestry, their records were marked. In the 1960s, church protocol was to first consult physical appearance, then family and genealogical records. Sometimes church leaders, including the First Presidency, were consulted to make overriding decisions about an individual's lineage; leaders would declare "racial purity" sometimes despite African ties in a member's heritage. If unsuccessful, Patriarchal blessings would be used to establish lineage. Usually, Patriarchal blessings were considered "final authority".

Generally, missionaries and LDS Church leaders avoided educating members about church policy surrounding black members of the church. Sometimes presentations urged members to avoid interracial marriage, but there was a lack of information about the church's policies and reasons behind them. Furthermore, the Portuguese translation of The Way to Perfection neglected to include information regarding the "lineage of Cain". Methods to determine lineage were vague and unclear. In 1965, McKay changed policies in Brazil that required all male converts in to be assumed qualified to receive the priesthood unless there was hard evidence otherwise. Brazilian church members were uncomfortable with the policies. They were often accused of racism by friends and family members, but they did not feel like they had the right or ability to suggest change. They believed the policy was revelation from God and only further revelation from God could change the policy.

In 1959, the Brazil South Mission was created, increasing the number of missionaries sent to Brazil. William Grant Bangerter, president of the northern Brazil mission, sent missionaries into areas that were previously avoided due to race. Previously, Bangerter sent missionaries to Recife and Pernambuco as a test to gauge the success of future missionary work. They did not have success at first, due to the large African-Brazilian population, anti-American feelings, and lack of familiarity with Mormonism. Missionary work improved after the baptism of Milton Soares, Jr. and his family. Soares influenced the baptism of many others and he became the branch president on October 27, 1961. Mission presidents began sending missionaries into North Brazil. Branches were established in Joāo Pessoa in 1960, Maceió in 1966, and Fortaleza and Campina Grande in 1968. Though missionaries in the north did not have as high of a baptism rate as the south, missionaries in the north tended to baptize people with higher education and economic status. Therefore, finding church members to serve in ecclesiastical leadership positions was not as difficult for missionaries in the north.

Spencer W. Kimball organized Brazil's first stake on May 1, 1966, in São Paulo with Walter Spät as president. This was the first stake in all of South America. Kimball had spent a lot of time visiting Brazil since 1959, and his experiences there made him aware of the doctrinal, administrative, and personal consequences related to priesthood restrictions. In 1967, the policy on race and the priesthood was changed such that dark skinned people were presumed eligible for the priesthood by default unless there was specific evidence of African descent. Starting in the 70s "lineage lessons" were added to determine that interested persons didn't have any Sub-Saharan African ancestry and thus deemed eligible for teaching. In March 1975, Kimball announced the LDS Church's intentions to construct a temple in São Paulo. Since priesthood ordination in males and lack of African ancestry in females were requirements to enter an LDS temple, the announcement led to questions and concerns about the current LDS Church policies on priesthood. Furthermore, Brazil was so racially mixed, it would be difficult to determine the eligibility of members to enter the temple without chance of error. James E. Faust, a general authority over Brazil, advocated for the "faithfulness" of black church members, as they had labored and financially provided for the temple as other church members had. Several other general authorities acknowledged the virtues of black church members in Brazil. In March 1978, a change of policies allowed black males as a junior companion in home teaching, a position previously restricted to priesthood holders.

In October 1977, a Missionary Training Center (MTC) was established in São Paulo, mainly for the training for missionaries from Brazil. Bangerter and members of the Church Educational System provided daily instruction for the missionaries. Following the MTC in Provo, Utah, it was the LDS Church's second MTC. In June 1978, the 1978 Revelation on Priesthood was announced, allowing all worthy male members of the LDS Church to be ordained to the priesthood, regardless of race. Later, in 1978, the São Paulo Temple was completed. It was the first temple in Brazil and in South America. Some scholars suggest that the opening of the temple in São Paulo may have influenced the church's decision to reverse the ban on men of African descent from holding the priesthood, due to difficulty in determining racial origins of many Brazilian church members.(See  main article.) After the opening of the temple in Brazil, missionary training in the MTC was increased from three to five days. Missionaries from other South American countries began to train in the Brazil MTC. In 1997, the Brazilian MTC moved to Casa Verde. The Casa Verde MTC was seven stories. After the 1978 Revelation on Priesthood, Marcus Martins, from Brazil, became the first missionary of African descent to be called after the announcement, postponing his marriage to serve his mission. As a result of the Revelation on Priesthood, proselyting in Brazil was expanded three-fold with missionaries sent to large cities in North Brazil after 1980, indicating that missionary work was no longer reserved for Europeans in South Brazil.

Recent developments
Brazil represents one of the countries in Latin America in which the LDS Church has experienced the most significant growth. Although its growth has been consistent for much of its history, growth accelerated significantly in 1984. This acceleration was partially due to the political and psychological effects of the end of Brazil's military dictatorship in 1985. Growth has slowed since mid-1990, yet the LDS Church experienced a 15 percent growth in Brazil from 1993 to 2003, over twice the growth of the LDS Church in Mexico. On March 31, 1990, Brazilian native, Helvécio Martins, father of Marcus, became the LDS Church's first general authority of African descent. Reactions were mixed. Many were happy, believing that this event signified change and a new paradigm for the LDS Church. LDS Church leaders attempted to minimize the event, stating that his race was not involved in the calling. Some believed the LDS Church appointed Martins to counteract previous accusations of racism from the media. In 1993, Brazil became the third country to have 100 stakes. In 2002, the São Paulo Brazil Temple was closed and renovated; one of the most prominent additions was the gold angel Moroni statue on top of the spire. Brazil's fifth temple in Curitiba began construction in March 2005. As of 2009, there were 234 stakes and 27 missions in Brazil.

On March 31, 2018, Ulisses Soares, from São Paulo, became the first Latin American called as a member of the Quorum of the Twelve Apostles.

Obstacles to missionary work
One challenge to LDS missionary work in Brazil is related to the strong ties between Brazilian culture and Catholicism. In Brazil, Catholicism is greatly tied to being Brazilian, meaning that changing religions is seen as rejecting family, history, and country. Furthermore, scholars have postulated that low densities of missionaries serving in lower-developed countries such as Brazil have limited the potential growth of the LDS Church in these countries. For example, a 1993 issue of Ensign stated that one-fifth of cities in Brazil with a population larger than 100,000 did not have missionaries serving in their city and with a large suburb of 2 million people only having two active missionaries serving there. Despite the high number of baptisms per year in Brazil, member retention can be low. For example, from 2000 to 2002, the LDS Church in Brazil had 66,000 baptisms, yet lost 190 congregations due to consolidation, representing the challenge that missionaries face in retaining Latin American converts. Additionally, in the 2000 census, 199,645 Brazilian residents identified with the LDS Church, whereas there were 700,000 people that had been baptized and listed in its membership rolls.

Statistics and other information
As of October 2018, the LDS Church reported 1,383,799 members, 34 missions, 354 family history centers, 268 stakes, 2,089 congregations with 1,651 wards and 438 branches, and 6 functioning temples.

Missions

Temples

Dedicated

Under Construction

Announced

See also

 Religion in Brazil

References

External links
 Brazilian Church News (in Portuguese) - Church news in Brazil
 Official website (in Portuguese) - The official Brazilian website of the Church of Jesus Christ of Latter-day Saints  
 Visitor's site (in Portuguese) - The official website for Portuguese speakers unfamiliar with the Church of Jesus Christ of Latter-day Saints 
 Mark L. Grover oral history interviews with Latter-day Saints in Brazil, MSS 6799, L. Tom Perry Special Collections, Harold B. Lee Library, Brigham Young University

Harold B. Lee Library-related Americana articles